Abbeville High School is a high school for grades 9–12 in Abbeville, South Carolina. It is part of the Abbeville County School District.

Sports 
Abbeville High School participates in 12 varsity sports throughout the year. Football, baseball, boys' and girls' basketball, and softball participate in junior varsity programs.

State championships 
 Basketball - Boys: 2016
 Football: 1971, 1981, 1991, 1996, 2010, 2011, 2015, 2016, 2017, 2018, 2020
 Softball: 2011
 Track - Boys: 1978, 1996, 1997

Notable alumni
 Leomont Evans — former National Football League (NFL) player for the Washington Redskins (1996–1999)
 Kenneth Moton — co-anchor of World News Now and America This Morning

See also
List of high schools in South Carolina

References

External links
 School website

Schools in Abbeville County, South Carolina
Public high schools in South Carolina